The 1981–82 Yorkshire Cup was the seventy-fourth occasion on which the  Yorkshire Cup competition had been held.

Castleford won the trophy by beating Bradford Northern by the score of 10–5

The match was played at Headingley, Leeds, now in West Yorkshire. The attendance was 5,852 and receipts were £10,359

1981 is the start of an incredible eleven years in which Castleford. previously only once winners in 1977, will make eight appearances in the Yorkshire Cup final, winning four and ending as runner-up in four occasions.

It is also the  first of two successive years when Bradford Northern played in the  Yorkshire Cup final, and in both cases they ended as runner-up

Background 
This season there were no junior/amateur clubs taking part, no new entrants and no "leavers" and so the total of entries remained the  same at sixteen.

This in turn resulted in no byes in the first round.

Competition and results

Round 1 
Involved 8 matches (with no byes) and 16 clubs

Round 2 – quarterfinals 
Involved 4 matches and 8 clubs

Round 3 – semifinals  
Involved 2 matches and 4 clubs

Final

Teams and scorers 

Scoring – Try = three points – Goal = two points – Drop goal = one point

The road to success

Notes and comments 
1 * Hunslet had moved to Leeds United's  Elland Road at the start of the season

2 * The attendance is given as 5,876 by RUGBYLEAGUEproject  but the  Rothmans Rugby League Yearbook of 1991–92 and 1990–91 gives the  attendance as twenty-four less  at 5,852

3 * Headingley, Leeds, is the home ground of Leeds RLFC with a capacity of 21,000. The record attendance was  40,175 for a league match between Leeds and Bradford Northern on 21 May 1947.

General information for those unfamiliar 
The Rugby League Yorkshire Cup competition was a knock-out competition between (mainly professional) rugby league clubs from  the  county of Yorkshire. The actual area was at times increased to encompass other teams from  outside the  county such as Newcastle, Mansfield, Coventry, and even London (in the form of Acton & Willesden).

The Rugby League season always (until the onset of "Summer Rugby" in 1996) ran from around August-time through to around May-time and this competition always took place early in the season, in the Autumn, with the final taking place in (or just before) December (The only exception to this was when disruption of the fixture list was caused during, and immediately after, the two World Wars)

See also 
1981–82 Rugby Football League season
Rugby league county cups

References

External links
Saints Heritage Society
1896–97 Northern Rugby Football Union season at wigan.rlfans.com 
Hull&Proud Fixtures & Results 1896/1897
Widnes Vikings – One team, one passion Season In Review – 1896–97
The Northern Union at warringtonwolves.org

1981 in English rugby league
RFL Yorkshire Cup